The 1988–89 La Liga season, the 58th since its establishment, started on September 3, 1988, and finished on June 25, 1989.

Real Madrid finished the season as champions for the fourth year running, while Barcelona recovered under new coach Johan Cruyff to finish second.

Teams

League table

Relegation playoff

First leg

Second leg

Results

Pichichi Trophy 

La Liga seasons
1988–89 in Spanish football leagues
Spain